Lee-Roy Newton (born 19 December 1978) is a South African sprinter. Together with Morné Nagel, Corné du Plessis and Matthew Quinn he won a silver medal in 4 x 100 metres relay at the 2001 World Championships in Athletics.

Following the ruling of 13 December 2005 which retroactively disqualified Tim Montgomery and henceforth the American team, the South African team were promoted to gold medallists.

At the 2006 Commonwealth Games in Melbourne, Newton won a silver medal with the South African team in the 4 x 100 metres relay.

In February 2007 Newton clocked 9.95 seconds in the 100 meters at the KwaZulu-Natal Athletics senior provincial track and field championships in Durban, narrowly beating teammate and training partner Dean Wicks, who clocked 10.00 seconds. In doing so, Newton would have become one of only 50 men to have broken the 10 second barrier in the 100m. Even Linda Ferns, CEO of Athletics SA, said the application to recognise Newton's time in Durban would be studied. "We will have to look at all the technical details and must ensure that a test for performance enhancers was done.".

On 13 February, the time was disqualified for three reasons: 1) Lee-Roy's reaction time of -0.046 seconds is considered too fast by IAAF rules, and therefore indicates he false started, 2) the finish line camera was not properly aligned with the finish line, possible by much as a meter, 3) he was not escorted to drug testing at the stadium, and rather was tested much later at his residence.

Personal bests 
 100 metres – 10.27 (2000); [9.95 (2007) unratified mark]
 200 metres – 20.75 (2000 & 2001)
 400 metres – 47.89 (2002)

References

External links
 

1978 births
Living people
South African male sprinters
World Athletics Championships medalists
Commonwealth Games silver medallists for South Africa
Athletes (track and field) at the 2006 Commonwealth Games
World Athletics Championships athletes for South Africa
Commonwealth Games medallists in athletics
African Games silver medalists for South Africa
African Games medalists in athletics (track and field)
Athletes (track and field) at the 1999 All-Africa Games
World Athletics Championships winners
Universiade medalists in athletics (track and field)
Universiade silver medalists for South Africa
Medalists at the 1999 Summer Universiade
20th-century South African people
21st-century South African people
Medallists at the 2006 Commonwealth Games